Glottiphyllum regium is a rare species of succulent plant, in the family Aizoaceae. It is known locally as "koeispene" ("cow-nipples" in the Afrikaans language). 
It is restricted to a small arid area near Calitzdorp in the Western Cape, South Africa.

Description
The leaves are bright green, upturned, fleshy and are born in pairs. The two leaves in a leaf-pair are a very similar size, unlike many other species of Glottiphyllum. The leaf-pairs grow in a decussate arrangement (each leaf-pair at right angles to the previous one, rather than all in the same two distichous rows). The leaf also does not have a swollen base (unlike Glottiphyllum cruciatum). The seed capsules are soft and spongy, with high rims.

References

regium
Taxa named by N. E. Brown